Peter Baikie (born 1957) is a Scottish comedian and composer.  He appeared in the British comedy sketch-show Absolutely, composed the theme music and provided comedy songs for the show.  He also created several musical comedy characters including Mr Muzak the Piano-playing man and the Laughing man.

As a television composer Baikie's credits include the theme music for Shooting Stars, It's Only TV...But I Like It and The Big Fat Quiz of the Year.

In the 1990s Baikie and fellow Absolutely cast member Gordon Kennedy toured as a band called The Hairstyles.  Their sets comprised songs from Absolutely, famous TV themes, songs from adverts and the Stoneybridge ceilidh.

Baikie was the bandleader on The Jack Docherty Show which launched with Channel Five in 1997. The house band was known as Pete Baikie and The Peetles in a reference to The Beatles. He also acted with Kenneth Branagh in the Disney film Swing Kids.

He has also won 4 Welsh BAFTAS as the producer of ‘Barry Welsh is Coming’ and ‘Hugh Pugh’s History of Wales’ for ITV Wales. He also produced ‘Pub Quiz’, ‘The Morwenna Banks show’ and numerous editions of ‘The Jack Docherty show’ for C5. He co-wrote and co-presented the world’s first comedy nature series ‘SquawkieTalkie’ in 1995 and was co-host of ‘Saturday Night Jack’ for Radio 2 in 2006.

He is a director of Absolutely Productions.

External links
 
 Biography
 Interview in which Pete discusses The Hairstyles and some of his recent work.

Living people
Male actors from Edinburgh
Scottish male television actors
1957 births
Scottish male comedians